is a Japanese voice actress who graduated from the Tokyo College of Music as a vocalist. She is best known for dubbing over a number of Disney heroines.

Roles
With the exception of her role in the Kingdom Hearts series, all entries in this list are dubbing roles.

Film & Movie animation
The Chipmunk Adventure (the Chipettes)

Television animation
Disney's House of Mouse (Ariel (Jodi Benson))

OVA
The Little Mermaid II: Return to the Sea (Ariel (Jodi Benson))
Mulan II (Mulan (Ming-Na))
Tarzan & Jane (Jane Porter (Olivia d'Abo))
The Little Mermaid: Ariel's Beginning (Ariel (Jodi Benson))

Theatrical animation
The Little Mermaid (Ariel (Jodi Benson))
Mulan (Mulan (Ming-Na))
Sleeping Beauty (Buena Vista edition) (Princess Aurora (Mary Costa))
Tarzan (Jane Porter (Minnie Driver))
Ralph Breaks the Internet (Aurora (Kate Higgins), Mulan (Ming-Na))

Video games
Kingdom Hearts (Jane, Ariel)
Kingdom Hearts II (Mulan, Ariel)
Kingdom Hearts Birth by Sleep (Aurora)

Live action
Roman Holiday (2004 TV edition) (Princess Ann (Audrey Hepburn))

References

External links
 

Japanese actresses
Living people
1970 births
Place of birth missing (living people)